Kubasov (Russian: Кубасов) is a Russian masculine surname originating from the word kub (cube), referring to a short, stout person; its feminine counterpart is Kubasova. It may refer to
Diana Kubasova (born 1989), Latvian beauty queen and model
Valeri Kubasov (1935–2014), Soviet/Russian cosmonaut

References

Russian-language surnames